Dave Gould (born Dezső Guttmann; March 11, 1899 - June 3, 1969) was a Hungarian-American choreographer and dance director. He is notable as one of the three people to win the short-lived Academy Award for Best Dance Direction.

Gould married show girl Mitzi Haynes on April 18, 1937.

References

External links

1899 births
1969 deaths
American choreographers
Hungarian choreographers
Best Dance Direction Academy Award winners
Hungarian emigrants to the United States